Pukaqucha (Quechua puca red, qucha lake, "red lake", Hispanicized spelling Pucaccocha) is a lake in Peru located in the Ayacucho Region, Lucanas Province, Puquio District. Pukaqucha lies southeast of the lakes named Yawriwiri, Urqunqucha, Sawaqucha and Apiñaqucha, south of Islaqucha and west of Tipiqucha.

See also
List of lakes in Peru

References

Lakes of Peru
Lakes of Ayacucho Region